La moglie in vacanza... l'amante in città (The wife on vacation ... the lover in town) is a 1980 commedia sexy all'italiana directed by Sergio Martino.

Plot 
During a holiday in Courmayeur, a wealthy industrialist from Parma finds himself in the same hotel with his wife, his lover and the lover of his wife.

Cast 
 Renzo Montagnani: Andrea Damiani
 Edwige Fenech: Giulia
 Barbara Bouchet: Valeria
 Lino Banfi: Peppino
 Tullio Solenghi: Giovanni La Carretta
 Marisa Merlini: mother-in-law of Andrea
 Pippo Santonastaso: Emilio Casadei
 Renzo Ozzano: Vasha Milova
 Jacques Stany: Toni

References

External links

1980 films
Commedia sexy all'italiana
Films directed by Sergio Martino
Films scored by Detto Mariano
Adultery in films
Films set in hotels
1980s sex comedy films
1980 comedy films
1980s Italian-language films
1980s Italian films